This is a list of Mexican football transfers in the Mexican Primera Division during the winter 2011–12 transfer window, grouped by club.

Mexican Primera Division

América

In:

Out:

Atlante

In:

Out:

Atlas

In:

Out:

Chiapas

In:

Out:

Cruz Azul

In:

Out:

Guadalajara

In:

Out:

Monterrey

In:

Out:

Morelia

In:

Out:

Pachuca

In:

Out:

Puebla

In:

Out:

Querétaro

In:

Out:

San Luis

In:

Out:

Santos Laguna

In:

Out:

Tecos

In:

Out:

Tijuana

In:

Out:

Toluca

In:

Out:

UANL

In:

Out:

UNAM

In:

Out:

See also 
 2011–12 Primera División de México season

References

External links 

Mexican
Winter 2011-12